Never Look Back is the first studio album by guitarist Blues Saraceno, released in 1989 through Guitar Recordings.

Critical reception

Vincent Jeffries at AllMusic awarded Never Look Back 2.5 stars out of 5, calling it an impressive debut and praising Saraceno as "A much more mature player than his post-Vai and -Satriani competitors". The songs "Full Tank", "Before the Storm" and "Frazin'" were noted as highlights.

Track listing

Personnel
Blues Saraceno – guitar, mixing, producer
Joe Franco – drum
Randy Coven – bass

Technical
Paul Orofino – engineering, mixing, producer
Carl Davino – engineering
John Stix – mixing, producer
George Marino – mastering

References

Blues Saraceno albums
1989 debut albums